Hayy Al-Shurtta is a neighborhood in the southwestern part of the Al Rashid district of Baghdad, Iraq. 

Shurta